The 1960 Iowa Hawkeyes football team represented the University of Iowa in the 1960 Big Ten Conference football season. The Hawkeyes were led by head coach Forest Evashevski, coaching in his 9th (and final) season. Iowa finished as co-Big Ten Conference champions with the Golden Gophers. The Golden Gophers were selected to represent the Big Ten in the Rose Bowl.

Schedule

Roster

Rankings

Game summaries

Oregon State

Northwestern

Michigan State

Wisconsin

Purdue

Kansas

Minnesota

Sources: Box Score and Game Story

Ohio State

Notre Dame

1961 NFL Draft

References

Iowa
Iowa Hawkeyes football seasons
Big Ten Conference football champion seasons
Iowa Hawkeyes football